Washington County is a county located in the U.S. state of North Carolina. As of the 2020 census, the population was 11,003. Its county seat is Plymouth. The county was formed in 1799 from the western third of Tyrrell County. It was named for George Washington.

History

There are three incorporated towns in Washington County; Plymouth is the county seat, while other towns are Roper and Creswell. Washington County is known for rich farmland, extensive forests and abundant public access waters. The Roanoke River and Albemarle Sound form the northern boundary. Lake Phelps is 16,000 acres and is part of Pettigrew State Park in Creswell. Somerset Place is a restored antebellum plantation and NC Historic Site on Lake Phelps.

The Pungo Unit of the Pocosin Lakes National Wildlife Refuge in the southern part of the county is said to have the best public black bear viewing in North Carolina.  This part of the state is known for having the world's largest black bears and highest black bear densities The award-winning NC Black Bear Festival takes place in Plymouth on the first weekend in June.

Geography

The county borders the Albemarle Sound.

National protected area
 Pocosin Lakes National Wildlife Refuge (part)

State and local protected areas/sites 
 Pettigrew State Park (part)
 Somerset Place
 Van Swamp Game Lands (part)

Major water bodies 
 Albemarle Sound
 Lake Phelps
 Pungo River
 Roanoke River

Adjacent counties
 Chowan County - north
 Perquimans County - northeast
 Tyrrell County - east
 Hyde County - southeast
 Beaufort County - southwest
 Martin County - west
 Bertie County - northwest

Major highways

Demographics

2020 census

As of the 2020 United States census, there were 11,003 people, 4,977 households, and 2,655 families residing in the county.

2000 census
As of the census of 2000, there were 13,723 people, 5,367 households, and 3,907 families residing in the county.  The population density was 39 people per square mile (15/km2).  There were 6,174 housing units at an average density of 18 per square mile (7/km2).  The racial makeup of the county was 48.28% White, 48.94% Black or African American, 0.05% Native American, 0.32% Asian, 0.04% Pacific Islander, 1.66% from other races, and 0.70% from two or more races.  2.27% of the population were Hispanic or Latino of any race.

There were 5,367 households, out of which 31.70% had children under the age of 18 living with them, 50.10% were married couples living together, 18.80% had a female householder with no husband present, and 27.20% were non-families. 24.70% of all households were made up of individuals, and 11.70% had someone living alone who was 65 years of age or older.  The average household size was 2.52 and the average family size was 2.99.

In the county, the population was spread out, with 26.00% under the age of 18, 7.70% from 18 to 24, 25.00% from 25 to 44, 25.80% from 45 to 64, and 15.50% who were 65 years of age or older.  The median age was 39 years. For every 100 females there were 89.70 males.  For every 100 females age 18 and over, there were 86.10 males.

The median income for a household in the county was $28,865, and the median income for a family was $34,888. Males had a median income of $27,058 versus $19,477 for females. The per capita income for the county was $14,994.  About 17.60% of families and 21.80% of the population were below the poverty line, including 31.50% of those under age 18 and 19.20% of those age 65 or over.

Government and politics
Washington County is a member of the Albemarle Commission regional council of governments.

Washington County was one of the proposed sites for a Navy outlying landing field. This practice airfield would allow pilots to simulate landings on an aircraft carrier. Plans for construction have been scrapped due to public backlash and potential ecological impact.

Education
Washington County School District contains all public schools. The district contains a high school, a five-year early college, a middle school, and two elementary schools.
 Washington County High School
 Washington County Early College High School
 Washington County Middle School
 Creswell Elementary School
 Pines Elementary School

Pocosin Innovative Charter School is a charter school separate from the district.

Communities

Towns
 Creswell
 Plymouth (county seat and largest town)
 Roper

Unincorporated communities
 Lake Phelps
 Mackeys
 Pea Ridge

Townships
 Plymouth
 Lees Mill
 Scuppernong
 Skinnersville

See also
 List of counties in North Carolina
 National Register of Historic Places listings in Washington County, North Carolina
 North Carolina State Parks

References

External links

 
 
 Washington County, NCGenWeb

 
1799 establishments in North Carolina
Populated places established in 1799
Majority-minority counties in North Carolina